Basista, officially the Municipality of Basista, is a 4th class municipality in the province of Pangasinan, Philippines. According to the 2020 census, it has a population of 37,679 people.

History
The former barrio of San Carlos, now the site of the town proper or poblacion was once the biggest and one of the progressive barrios located in the far south of the mother town, San Carlos (now a city).

As early as 1918, influential and prominent citizens of the then barrio of Basista came together and made the first attempt to petition the municipal government and the provincial board of San Carlos and Pangasinan respectively to grant the township of their barrios. Prominent politicians during that time volunteered their help in making representations with the proper authorities, but their request was not granted. 

On September 5, 1961, President Carlos P. Garcia issued Executive Order No. 446 creating the town of Basista composed of 13 barrios out of the 28 that petitioned. Four years after, however, the Philippine Supreme Court declared the town's creation as without legal basis citing their ruling in the "Emmanuel Pelaez vs. Auditor General" that "municipalities created under Executive Orders are void". It was here that Republic Act No. 4866 filed by Representative Jack L. Soriano was enacted into law and legally created Basista as a town of Pangasinan.

Geography

Barangays
Basista is politically subdivided into 13 barangays. 

 Anambongan
 Bayoyong
 Cabeldatan
 Dumpay
 Malimpec East
 Mapolopolo
 Nalneran
 Navatat
 Obong
 Osmena, Sr.
 Palma
 Patacbo
 Poblacion

These barangays are headed by elected officials: Barangay Captain, Barangay Council, whose members are called Barangay Councilors. All are elected every three years.

Climate

Demographics

Economy

Government
Basista, belonging to the second congressional district of the province of Pangasinan, is governed by a mayor designated as its local chief executive and by a municipal council as its legislative body in accordance with the Local Government Code. The mayor, vice mayor, and the councilors are elected directly by the people through an election which is being held every three years.

Elected officials

Landmarks 
 Mary Help of Christians Parish Church of Basista
 Basista Municipal Hall
 Basista Central School
 Basista National High School

Image gallery

References

External links

 Basista Profile at PhilAtlas.com
 Municipal Profile at the National Competitiveness Council of the Philippines
 Basista at the Pangasinan Government Website
 Republic Act 4866 : An Act declaring Basista a duly constituted municipality of Pangasinan
 Local Governance Performance Management System
 [ Philippine Standard Geographic Code]
 Philippine Census Information

Municipalities of Pangasinan
Establishments by Philippine executive order